The Anisfield-Wolf Book Award is an American literary award dedicated to honoring written works that make important contributions to the understanding of racism and the appreciation of the rich diversity of human culture. Established in 1935 by Cleveland poet and philanthropist Edith Anisfield Wolf and originally administered by the Saturday Review, the awards have been administered by the Cleveland Foundation since 1963.

Several awards in the categories of fiction, poetry, nonfiction, and lifetime achievement  are given out each September in a ceremony free and open to the public and attended by the honorees. Winners include Zora Neale Hurston (1943), Langston Hughes (1954), Martin Luther King Jr. (1959), Maxine Hong Kingston (1978), Wole Soyinka (1983), Nadine Gordimer (1988), Toni Morrison (1988), Ralph Ellison (1992), Edward Said (2000), and Derek Walcott (2004).

The jury has been composed of prominent American writers and scholars at least since 1991, when long-time jury chairman Ashley Montagu, a renowned anthropologist, asked poet Rita Dove and scholar Henry Louis Gates Jr. to help him judge the large number of books submitted annually by publishers across the disciplines. When Montagu retired in 1996, Gates assumed the chair position. Like Gates, Rita Dove has remained a juror to this day; in 1996 she was joined by evolutionary biologist Stephen Jay Gould, writer Joyce Carol Oates and historian Simon Schama. After Gould's death in 2002, psychologist Steven Pinker replaced him on the jury.

Winners

Fiction

Poetry

Nonfiction

Lifetime achievement

Special Achievement Award 
1992 – Ralph Ellison for Invisible Man

Notes

References

External links
 Anisfield-Wolf.org – official website
 Anisfield-Wolf Book Awards at lovethebook.com

Awards established in 1935
American fiction awards
American non-fiction literary awards
Literary awards honoring lifetime achievement
Culture of Cleveland
1935 establishments in the United States
Anti-racism